A B-type subdwarf (sdB) is a kind of subdwarf star with spectral type B. They differ from the typical subdwarf by being much hotter and brighter. They are situated at the "extreme horizontal branch" of the Hertzsprung–Russell diagram. Masses of these stars are around 0.5 solar masses, and they contain only about 1% hydrogen, with the rest being helium.  Their radius is from 0.15 to 0.25 solar radii, and their temperature is from 20,000 to 40,000K.

These stars represent a late stage in the evolution of some stars, caused when a red giant star loses its outer hydrogen layers before the core begins to fuse helium. The reasons why this premature mass loss occurs are unclear, but the interaction of stars in a binary star system is thought to be one of the main mechanisms. Single subdwarfs may be the result of a merger of two white dwarfs. The sdB stars are expected to become white dwarfs without going through any more giant stages.

Subdwarf B stars, being more luminous than white dwarfs, are a significant component in the hot star population of old stellar systems, such as globular clusters, spiral galaxy bulges and elliptical galaxies.  They are prominent on ultraviolet images.  The hot subdwarfs are proposed to be the cause of the UV upturn in the light output of elliptical galaxies.

History
Subdwarf B stars were discovered by Zwicky and Humason around 1947 when they found subluminous blue stars around the north galactic pole.  In the Palomar-Green survey they were discovered to be the commonest kind of faint blue star with a magnitude over 18. During the 1960s spectroscopy discovered that many of the sdB stars are deficient in hydrogen, with abundances below that predicted by the Big Bang theory. In the early 1970s Greenstein and Sargent measured temperatures and gravity strengths and were able to plot their correct position on the Hertzsprung–Russell diagram.

Variables
There are three kinds of variable stars in this category:

Firstly there are the sdBV with periods from 90 to 600 seconds.  They are also called EC14026 or V361 Hya stars. A proposed new nomenclature is sdBVr, with r standing for rapid. One theory for the oscillations of these stars is that the variations in brightness are due to acoustic mode oscillations with low degree (l) and low order (n).  They are driven by ionisation of iron group atoms causing opacity.  The velocity curve is 90 degrees out of phase with the brightness curve, while the effective temperature and surface gravity acceleration curves appear to be in phase with the flux variations.  In plots of temperature against surface gravity, the short-period pulsators cluster together in the so-called empirical instability strip, approximately defined by T=28000–35000 K and log g=5.2–6.0. Only 10% of sdBs falling in the empirical strip are observed to pulsate.

Secondly there are the long period variables with periods from 45 to 180 minutes. A proposed new nomenclature is sdBVs, with s standing for slow.  These only have a very small variation of 0.1%.  They have also been called PG1716 or V1093 Her or abbreviated as LPsdBV. The long-period pulsating sdB stars are generally cooler than their rapid counterparts, with T~23000–30000K.

Stars that oscillate in both period regimes are 'hybrids', with a standard nomenclature of sdBVrs. A prototype is DW Lyncis also identified as HS 0702+6043.

*eclipsing binary star

Planetary systems
There are at least four sdB stars which may possess planetary systems. However, in all four cases, subsequent research has indicated that the evidence for the planets' existence was not as strong as previously believed, and whether or not the planetary systems exist is not proven either way.

V391 Pegasi was the first sdB star believed to have an exoplanet in orbit around it, although subsequent research has significantly weakened the evidentiary case for the planet's existence.

Kepler-70 may have a system of two or more close-orbiting planets, although later research suggests that this is unlikely to be the case.

KIC 10001893 (also known as Kepler-429) may possess a system of three roughly Earth-sized planets in very close orbit. If these exist, then they would be similar to the hypothetical Kepler-70 exoplanets. However, the same new techniques that cast doubt on the Kepler-70 exoplanets were applied in this case too  and indicated that the three signals which had been detected could in fact merely be misleading artifacts in the data that earlier analysis techniques had not handled well.

If Kepler-70's two close-orbiting planets do exist, they may be the remnants of the cores of close-orbiting gas giants. These would have been engulfed by the red giant progenitor, and the rocky/metallic cores would be the only parts of the planets to survive without being evaporated. Alternatively, they may be sections of core from one larger gas giant, engulfed as described, with the core having fragmented inside the star.

2MASS J19383260+4603591 is the close binary system of subdwarf B and red dwarf star, which was once claimed to be orbited by the circumbinary planet Kepler-451b.

References

B